Tiye, also spelled Tiy, Tiyi, Tiya was an ancient Egyptian name; according to Aldred, the pet name for Nefertari. Its notable bearers were:

 Queen Tiye, wife of Amenhotep III, mother of Akhenaten and possible sister of Ay (18th dynasty)
 Queen Tey, wife of Ay, wet nurse of Nefertiti, possibly mother of Mutbenret (18th dynasty)
 Queen Tiye-Mereniset, wife of Setnakht, mother of Ramesses III (20th dynasty)
 Queen Tiye, wife of Ramesses III, against whom she was involved in a harem conspiracy to put her son Pentawere on the throne. (20th dynasty)

"Tiy" is also an online moniker used by Finn Bruce, the founder of Chucklefish.

References

See also
 
 
 Ti (disambiguation)
 Ty (disambiguation)
 Tie (disambiguation)
 Tey (disambiguation)
 Tiya, a town in southern Ethiopia
 Tiyi, a mountain in Nagaland

Ancient Egyptian given names